The Skeena Mountains, also known as the Skeenas, are a subrange of the Interior Mountains of northern British Columbia, Canada, essentially flanking the upper basin of the Skeena River. They lie just inland from the southern end of the Boundary Ranges of the Coast Mountains, and also of the northern end of the Kitimat Ranges (another subrange of the Coast Mountains). Their southern limit is described by the Bulkley River (a major tributary of the Skeena; its valley and that of the lower Skeena River are used by BC Highway 16) and the upper northwestern reaches of Babine and Takla Lakes, and on their northeast by the upper reaches of the Omineca River.

To the north the Skeenas abut the southern Tahltan Highland and Klastline Plateau, part of the southern reaches of the Stikine Plateau and the Spatsizi Plateau, another subplateau of the Stikine Plateau, which includes the uppermost part of the course of the Stikine River. To the northwest, across the narrow confines of the Spatsizi Plateau, are the Stikine Ranges of the Cassiar Mountains, while to the east of the Skeenas are the Omineca Mountains, while their southward counterparts are the Hazelton Mountains, all part of the Interior Mountains.

Sub-ranges and mountains
Atna Range, bounded by Shedin Creek, Shelagyote Creek, and Babine River.
Shedin Peak, highest summit of the Atna Range, .
Babine Range, between Babine Lake, Babine River, Bulkey River and Skeena River.
Mount Thomlinson
Sidina Mountain
Mount Thoen
Nine Mile Mountain
Netalzul Mountain
Mount Seaton
Mount Cronin
Bait Range, on the west side of northern Takla Lake.
Bait Peak, highest summit of the Bait Range, .
Mount Lovel
Mount Teegee
Frypan Peak
Trail Peak
Driftwood Range, between the headwaters of Driftwood River and Nilkitkwa River.
Driftwood Peak, highest summit of the Driftwood Range, .
Skutsil Knob
Klappan Range, between the Klappan River and Iskut River.
Maitland Volcano
Todagin Mountain
Tsatia Mountain
Oweegee Range, on the east side of Bell-Irving River.
Mount Skowill
Delta Peak
Mount Klayduc
Sicintine Range, south of the Skeena River between Sicintine River and Squingula River.
Shelagyote Peak, highest summit of the Sicintine Range, .
Nilkitkwa Peak
Mount Horetzky
Slamgeesh Range, between the Skeena River and Slamgeesh River.
Notchtop Peak
Stephen Peak
Foster Peak
Strata Range, between the Bell-Irving River, Taylor River, Taft Creek and Nass River.
Takla Range, bounded by Takla Lake and Northwest Arm.
Boling Peak
Base Peak
Spike Peak

See also
Sacred Headwaters
Mosque River

Notes

References

S. Holland, Landforms of British Columbia, BC Government, 1976

 
Physiographic sections
Skeena Country